Adam Greydon Reid is a Canadian actor, writer, producer and director.

Biography
Reid attended Ryerson University's film program and won the 'Norman Jewison Filmmaker's Award' for his graduating short, Token for your Thoughts, which also won a 'Gold Plaque Award' at Chicago's Intercom: The International Communications Film & Video Competition. While directing commercials, music videos and shorts, Reid toured with the Canadian comedy troupe The Komic Kazes; this led his first film role, in the 1996 Kids in the Hall's feature, Brain Candy. In 2000, a 90-second theatrical spot for Toyota in which he stars as a pretentious and insecure commercial director, won a 'Gold Lion' at the Cannes International Advertising Festival.

Reid appeared in films, M.O.W.s and television series, including Disney's My Date with the President's Daughter(1998), Lifetime's This Time Around (2003), CBC's The Newsroom, Ham & Cheese (2004), The Buck Calder Experience (2006), Fox's Killer Instinct (2006), and USA's Psych (2010). As a voice actor, he has appeared in cartoons like What It's Like Being Alone (2006), Total Drama (2007) and 6Teen (2004-2010).

From 2002 to 2006, along with developing and directing kids shows like HBO Family's Ghost Trackers (2005-1007) and YTV's The Adrenaline Project (2007-2009), Reid ran a film mentorship program at the Toronto youth shelter Eva's Phoenix,. The program produced two short films under Adam's direction, One Dollar One Day and Sheltered Life (2006).

In 2009, Reid completed his first documentary, Marion Woodman: Dancing in the Flames, which debuted in sold-out bookings at New York's Rubin Museum of Art and the Vancouver International Film Festival.

Reid returned to performance work in 2010, in the Hallmark Hall of Fame/CBS movie, "When Love Is Not Enough: The Lois Wilson Story", starring Winona Ryder as Lois Wilson, and Barry Pepper as Bill Wilson (Bill W.) Reid played Ebby Thacher, Bills best friend and drinking buddy, whose recovery from alcoholism inspired Bill to found Alcoholics Anonymous.

In 2019, Reid created the award-winning web series Hospital Show.

Filmography

Film

Television

References

External links
 Official Website for BullRush Pictures

Living people
Canadian male film actors
Canadian male television actors
Canadian male voice actors
Canadian male web series actors
Male actors from Ottawa
21st-century Canadian male actors
Year of birth missing (living people)